The Squid and the Whale is a 2005 American independent comedy-drama film written and directed by Noah Baumbach and produced by Wes Anderson. It tells the semi-autobiographical story of two boys in Brooklyn dealing with their parents' divorce in 1986. The film is named after the giant squid and sperm whale diorama housed at the American Museum of Natural History, which is seen in the film. The film was shot on Super 16 mm, mostly using a handheld camera.

At the 2005 Sundance Film Festival, the film won awards for best dramatic direction and screenwriting, and was nominated for the Grand Jury Prize. Baumbach later received an Academy Award nomination for Best Original Screenplay. The film received six Independent Spirit Award nominations and three Golden Globe nominations. Baumbach became one of the few screenwriters to ever sweep "The Big Four" critics awards (Los Angeles Film Critics' Association, National Board of Review, National Society of Film Critics, and New York Film Critics' Circle).

Plot
It is 1986. Bernard Berkman is an arrogant, once-promising novelist whose career has gone into a slow decline; he cannot find an agent. His unfaithful wife, Joan, has recently begun publishing her own work to widespread acclaim, which only increases the growing tension between them. One day, Bernard and Joan tell their two sons, 16-year-old Walt and 12-year-old Frank, that they are separating, with Bernard renting a house on the other side of Prospect Park from their home in Park Slope, Brooklyn.

The parents agree to joint custody, and to spending equal time with their children, but, after separation, the parental relationship becomes more combative than before. Joan begins dating Ivan, Frank's tennis instructor, and Bernard starts sharing his new house with Lili, one of his students. The two boys begin taking sides in the battle between their parents, with Frank siding with his mother and Walt with his father. Walt idolizes his father: he blames his mother and tries to emulate his father.

Along with the trouble both boys exhibit verbally with their parents, they also show internal struggles and very different ways of handling the stress of their parents' divorce. Frank repeatedly masturbates at school; he begins to drink beer and imitates Ivan's mannerisms. Over-influenced by his father, Walt spoils his relationship with Sophie, his girlfriend, and she breaks up with him. He performs and claims to have written "Hey You" by Pink Floyd at his school's talent show. After he wins first place and receives praise from his family and friends, his school realizes that he did not write the song. At this point, the school calls Bernard and Joan in to discuss Walt. They all agree that he should see the school psychologist.

At the meeting with the psychologist, Walt starts to see things without the taint of his father's opinions. The psychologist asks Walt for a happy memory. After some reluctance, he tells how his mother would take him, when he was very young, to see the giant squid and whale exhibit at the American Museum of Natural History; the exhibit scared him, so he would look at it through his fingers. Then, at home, they would discuss what they saw. As they talked, the exhibit would become less scary. It becomes clear to Walt that his father was never really present, and that his mother was the one who cared for him.

After a heated argument between Bernard and Joan over custody and whether Joan would take him back, Bernard collapses on the street outside their home and is taken to the hospital. Bernard asks Walt to stay by his side, but Walt instead runs to the Natural History Museum. The film ends with him standing in front of the exhibit, now able to look at it.

Cast
 Jeff Daniels as Bernard Berkman; a selfish and arrogant writer. 
 Laura Linney as Joan Berkman; a writer and unfaithful ex-wife.
 Jesse Eisenberg as Walt Berkman
 Owen Kline as Frank Berkman
 Anna Paquin as Lili
 William Baldwin as Ivan
 Halley Feiffer as Sophie Greenberg
 Ken Leung as School Therapist
 David Benger as Carl
 Adam Rose as Otto
 Peter Newman as Mr. Greenberg
 Peggy Gormley as Mrs. Greenberg
 Greta Kline as Greta Greenberg
 Maryann Plunkett as Ms. Lemon
 Alexandra Daddario as Pretty Girl

Production 
Bill Murray, a frequent collaborator to producer Wes Anderson, was considered for the role of Bernard Berkman. John Turturro was also considered for the role.

Noah Baumbach looked to documentaries, French New Wave films, and John Cassavetes and early Martin Scorsese films when envisioning the style of the film. He shot the film in Super 16 rather than digital video "to give the film an authentic 1980’s feel", commenting "Super 16 also feels lived-in, instantly looks like an older film. I wanted to handhold the movie, but steadily, so you detect only a hint of movement. It added to the immediacy of the whole thing." 

The screenplay was intentionally pared down. Baumbach explained, "I really wanted this [film] to be an experience that people live through. Which is how people talk about action films. In some ways, maybe the cinematic equivalent of that would be not to give people moments of reflection. So that you’re taken through each scene, and then you’re right into another. A lot of scenes start on the dialogue, and the dialogue prelapses the next scene — So you never have time. There’s no sun rises over Brooklyn shot, no establishing shot." Baumbach has said the film is semi-autobiographical.

Reception
On Rotten Tomatoes, the film has a 92% approval rating, based on 154 reviews, with an average rating of 7.90/10. The site's critical consensus reads, "This is a piercingly honest, acidly witty look at divorce and its impact on a family." On Metacritic, the film has a weighted average score of 82 out of 100, based on 37 critics, indicating "universal acclaim".

On an episode of Ebert & Roeper, both critics praised the film and gave it a "two thumbs up" rating. Premiere critic Glenn Kenny praised the film, writing, "It's a rare film that can be convincingly tender, bitterly funny, and ruthlessly cutting over the course of fewer than 90 minutes. The Squid and the Whale not only manages this, it also contains moments that sock you with all three qualities at the same time." Time critic Richard Corliss wrote, "The Squid and the Whale is domestic tragedy recollected as comedy: a film whose catalog of deceits and embarrassments, and of love pratfalling over itself, makes it as (excruciatingly) painful as it is (exhilaratingly) funny."

The English Indie folk band Noah and the Whale takes its name from a combination of the director's name (Noah Baumbach) and the film's title.

Accolades

Home media
The film was released on DVD on March 21, 2006 by Sony Pictures Home Entertainment. The DVD includes a 45-minute commentary with director Noah Baumbach, another 40-minute commentary with Baumbach and Phillip Lopate, cast interviews, and trailers. In 2013 Mill Creek Entertainment released the film for the first time on Blu-ray in a 2 pack set with Running with Scissors. All extras were dropped for the Blu-ray release.

The Criterion Collection re-released the film on DVD and Blu-ray on November 22, 2016 which included new interviews with Baumbach and actors Jeff Daniels, Jesse Eisenberg, Owen Kline and Laura Linney; a new conversation about the score and other music in the film between Baumbach and composers Dean Wareham and Britta Phillips; a 2005 documentary titled Behind The Squid and the Whale; audition footage; and the original trailers.

Music
The soundtrack features two songs by Loudon Wainwright III and one by Kate & Anna McGarrigle. It reuses Tangerine Dream's "Love on a Real Train", from Risky Business, for the scenes of Frank's sexual awakenings. Other contemporary popular music is played in the background of scenes, such as The Cars' "Drive" and Bryan Adams' "Run to You". "Figure Eight", from Schoolhouse Rock, is used as both an instrumental and a vocal. Pink Floyd's "Hey You" is heard several times in the movie, since it plays a role in the plot and is cited by Walt as capturing his emotional state. Both the original version, and diegetic performances by Jesse Eisenberg and Owen Kline, are used. Baumbach originally wanted to use The Who's "Behind Blue Eyes" instead but he could not secure the rights.

 Soundtrack

 "Park Slope" – Britta Phillips & Dean Wareham
 "Courting Blues" – Bert Jansch
 "Holland Tunnel" – John Phillips
 "Lullaby" – Loudon Wainwright III
 "Heart Like a Wheel" – Kate & Anna McGarrigle
 "The Bright New Year" – Bert Jansch
 "Drive" – The Cars
 "Let's Go" – The Feelies
 "Figure Eight" – Blossom Dearie
 "Come Sing Me a Happy Song to Prove We All Can Get Along the Lumpy, Bumpy, Long & Dusty Road" – Bert Jansch
 "Hey You " – Pink Floyd (Performed by Dean Wareham)
 "Family Conference" – Britta Phillips & Dean Wareham
 "Street Hassle" – Lou Reed
 "The Swimming Song" – Loudon Wainwright III
 "Love on a Real Train" – Tangerine Dream

References

External links

 
 
 
 
 
 The Squid and the Whale: 4 Way Street an essay by Kent Jones at the Criterion Collection

2005 films
2000s coming-of-age comedy-drama films
American coming-of-age comedy-drama films
Films about writers
Films about dysfunctional families
Films directed by Noah Baumbach
Films set in 1986
Films set in Brooklyn
Films about educators
American avant-garde and experimental films
Films produced by Wes Anderson
2000s avant-garde and experimental films
Sundance Film Festival award winners
2005 independent films
Films about divorce
Films about brothers
Films about mother–son relationships
Films about father–son relationships
Films shot in 16 mm film
2000s English-language films
2000s American films